Navut may refer to:
Navut language
Navut (startup)